The shekere (from Yoruba Ṣẹ̀kẹ̀rẹ̀) is a West African percussion instrument consisting of a dried gourd with beads or cowries woven into a net covering the gourd. The Shekere originated in a tribe in Nigeria called the Yoruba. The instrument is common in West African and Latin American folkloric traditions as well as some of the popular music styles. In performance it is shaken and/or hit against the hands.

The shekere is made from vine gourds that grow on the ground. The shape of the gourd determines the sound of the instrument. A shekere is made by drying the gourd for several months then removing the pulp and seeds. After it is scrubbed, skillful bead work is added as well as colour.

Varieties
Throughout the African continent there are similar gourd/bead or gourd/seed percussion instruments. Some are the lilolo, axatse (Ghana), djabara (Guinea), ushàkà, chequere and saa saa (Liberia). The agbe is a gourd drum with cowrie shells and is usually strung with white cotton thread.  The axatse is a small gourd, held by the neck and percussed between hand and leg. In Liberia, the net has a long "tail" through which the beads are manipulated. 
 
In Cuba, the chekeré, also known as aggué (abwe), is a large, hollow gourd (~50 cm long, approx.  in) almost entirely surrounded by a network of cords, to which many coloured beads are attached. Widely used in Afro-Cuban sacred and popular music, it may be twisted, shaken or slapped producing a subtle variety of effects; musically, it is more flexible than maracas.

In Brazil, this African gourd rattle is called a xequerê. It consists of the gourd (cabaça) cut in the middle and then wrapped in a net in which beads or small plastic balls are threaded. The afoxé is a similar, smaller instrument.

References

External links
Video of this instrument being played

Unpitched percussion instruments
West African musical instruments
Bissau-Guinean musical instruments
Brazilian percussion
Burkinabé musical instruments
Cuban musical instruments
Gambian musical instruments
Guinean musical instruments
Ivorian musical instruments
Malian musical instruments
Senegalese musical instruments
Idiophones
Gourd musical instruments